Mt. Carmel is a census-designated place (CDP) in McCormick County, South Carolina, United States. The population was 237 at the 2000 census.

History
The Calhoun Mill and Mount Carmel Historic District are listed on the National Register of Historic Places.

Geography
Mount Carmel is located at  (34.012272, -82.507075).

According to the United States Census Bureau, the CDP has a total area of 9.2 square miles (23.8 km), all land.

Demographics

At the 2000 census there were 237 people, 86 households, and 63 families living in the CDP. The population density was 25.8 people per square mile (9.9/km). There were 106 housing units at an average density of 11.5/sq mi (4.4/km).  The racial makeup of the CDP was 5.49% White, 89.87% African American, 1.27% Asian, and 3.38% from two or more races. Hispanic or Latino of any race were 1.69%.

Of the 86 households 19.8% had children under the age of 18 living with them, 33.7% were married couples living together, 31.4% had a female householder with no husband present, and 25.6% were non-families. 24.4% of households were one person and 11.6% were one person aged 65 or older. The average household size was 2.76 and the average family size was 3.31.

The age distribution was 24.5% under the age of 18, 9.3% from 18 to 24, 26.2% from 25 to 44, 29.1% from 45 to 64, and 11.0% 65 or older. The median age was 38 years. For every 100 females, there were 94.3 males. For every 100 females age 18 and over, there were 92.5 males.

The median household income was $19,531 and the median family income  was $28,500. Males had a median income of $34,375 versus $21,563 for females. The per capita income for the CDP was $9,777. About 46.8% of families and 48.8% of the population were below the poverty line, including 57.1% of those under the age of eighteen and 75.0% of those sixty five or over.

References

Census-designated places in McCormick County, South Carolina
Census-designated places in South Carolina